The BUT 9613T was a two-axle double-deck trolleybus chassis manufactured by British United Traction in 1957/58. A total of 90 were manufactured by Crossley Motors' Stockport factory, all for Glasgow.

References

British United Traction
Trolleybuses
Vehicles introduced in 1957